The United States Air Force's 114th Space Control Squadron (SPCS) is a Florida Air National Guard unit located at Patrick Space Force Base and Cape Canaveral Space Force Station, Florida. It is operationally gained by the United States Space Force.

Mission
The 114 SPCS mission is two-fold: First, to deliver offensive counterspace and space situational awareness, as appropriate, to rapidly achieve flexible and versatile effects in support of global and theater campaigns and to provide mission-ready citizen-Airmen and equipment to Combatant Commanders in support of operations worldwide. Second, as an Air National Guard asset the 114 SPCS is also available for state contingencies (hurricanes, floods, fires, domestic response, etc.) and is subject to activation by the Governor of Florida in times of emergency. Its primary mission, once activated, is to man the Emergency Support Function #5 (Information and Planning) at the State Emergency Operations Center - Tallahassee, FL which involves collecting, analyzing, processing and disseminating information for potential or actual disasters/emergencies in order for Federal Government agencies to provide humanitarian assistance to the affected hard-hit areas.

History
The 114th Communications Squadron (114 CS) was Federally recognized on 15 May 1989. Originally conceived to provide manning for pre-positioned NATO satellite communications terminals in the event of war against the Soviet Union, the unit mission was labeled NABS, or NATO Air Base Satellite. At the time it was equipped with only one TSC-85B terminal for training and 35 members. There were only two career fields offered to traditional guard members, satellite communications and electrical power production. Patrick AFB was selected as its home location because the active duty Air Force's 2nd Communications Group was also located at Patrick and could provide training and mentorship. The level of highly technical industries located on the Space Coast and in the nearby Orlando/Central Florida area also factored to place the 114th in Cocoa Beach, Florida.

The first commander of the 114 CBCS, Lieutenant Colonel Robert Chandler took the lead from its inception until January 1991, driving the recruiting and organizational efforts. This was when the worldwide legacy began, with support of operations in Turkey and Saudi Arabia, including Operations Desert Shield and Desert Storm.

The next commander was Major (later Lieutenant Colonel and Colonel) David Barnhart. Major Barnhart led the 114th from January 1991 to September 1994. During Maj Barnhart's tenure, the team's experience grew exponentially: not only were operational missions conducted in Spain, Germany, Italy, Honduras, Saudi Arabia, Canada and Colombia, but now humanitarian efforts drew members to hurricane relief efforts in Jamaica and south Florida. Additionally, various stateside exercises, including Coronet Stroke and Combat Challenge, tested the fiber of the already mature unit. In the summerof 1992, as part of a USAF-wide reorganization of major commands, TAC was disestablished and the squadron's new operational gaining command became the Air Combat Command (ACC).  The squadron was later redesignated as the 114th Combat Communications Squadron (114 CBCS) on 1 October 1992. In January 1994, the 114th received its first Air Force Outstanding Unit Award.

Lieutenant Colonel Michele Agee assumed command in September 1994. She led the unit through further expansion with missions in Haiti, Panama, Egypt, Croatia, Morocco and Bosnia along with numerous events in Florida, New Mexico, Oklahoma and Utah. In 1995, the squadron began building up the 114th Range Flight to support 45th Space Wing (45 SW) launch operations. These members were co-located with the 45th Range Squadron (45 RANS) at Cape Canaveral Air Force Station.

In January 1998, Major Daniel Bates took command, with personnel already deployed to Bosnia and later to Italy. In 1999, a partnership with the Air Force Research Lab was established to develop the Ballistic Missile Range Safety Technology (BMRST) system and the 114 CBCS personnel were commissioned to provide support to the program. In January 2001, the 114 CBCS deployed to the Kodiak Launch Complex, Kodiak, Alaska, to demonstrate the BMRST system's ability to rapidly deploy, set up and support a rocket launch with the Quick Reaction Launch Vehicle (QRLV) rocket launching from this site.

After 11 September 2001, large elements of the squadron deployed to Qatar and MacDill Air Force Base in support of Operations Enduring Freedom and Iraqi Freedom. Additionally, the 114th CBCS received its second Air Force Outstanding Unit Award. The unit deployed to Kodiak again in May 2002 for a second QRLV launch.

In 2005, The 114 CBCS was re-designated the 114th Range Operations Squadron (114 ROPS), their mission was to provide survivable and reliable satellite voice and data communications for command control and logistics in support of United States Air Force, Air Force Space Command, and NATO communications requirements.  With this change, the squadron's operational gaining command also shifted from ACC to the Air Force Space Command (AFSPC).  The 114 ROPS supported launch range operation tracking of the NASA Space Transportation System, Atlas, Delta, and Titan launches for the 45th Space Wing (45 SW).

The 114th received its third Air Force Outstanding Unit Award in 2009.

In 2011, the 114th supported the launch of STS-135, the orbiter Atlantis, on the final space shuttle mission.

Due to U.S. Air Force structure changes announced in March 2012, the 114 ROPS was scheduled for inactivation on 1 October 2012. However, this decision was reversed and instead the unit assumed a new mission as the 114th Space Control Squadron (114 SPCS) in April 2014. The first commander of the newly renamed squadron was Lt Col Johnny Malpass.

In November 2014, in order to comply with Air Force Instruction 38-101, several units of the Florida Air National Guard were administratively realigned under the 125th Fighter Wing (125 FW) as geographically separated units (GSUs) of the 125th as the new parent wing.  This included administrative assignment of the 114 SPCS to the 125 FW.

With the inactivation of AFSPC and the establishment of the United States Space Force (USSF) in 2019 and the later redesignation of the 45 SW as Space Launch Delta 45 (SLD 45), the 114 SPCS gaining organization became the USSF.  However, until the status of ANG units supporting the USSF is resolved, the 114 SPCS remains a USAF organization.

Previous designations
 114th Range Operations Squadron, 2005–2014
 114th Combat Communications Squadron, 1992–2005
 114th Communications Squadron (NABS), 1989–1992

Previous Commanders
 Lt Col (ret) Kyle Beatty, 2017–2020
 Lt Col (ret) Johnny Malpass, 2012–2017
 Lt Col (ret) Todd M. Oller, 2007–2012
 Lt Col (ret) Rembert N Schofield, 2003–2007
 Lt Col (ret) Daniel P. Bates, 1998–2003
 Lt Col (ret) Michele M. Agee, 1994–1998
 Col (ret) David H. Barnhart, 1991–1994
 Lt Col (ret) Robert Chandler, 1989–1991

Bases stationed
 Patrick Air Force Base, Florida (1989-2020)
 Patrick Space Force Base, Florida (2020-present)
 Cape Canaveral Air Force Station, Florida (1989-2020)
 Cape Canaveral Space Force Station, Florida (2020-present)

Equipment operated
 (1989-1991) TSC-85B Satellite Communications Terminal TSC-93B SATCOM
 (2001-2014) Ballistic Missile Range Safety Technology (BMRST)

References

External links

Squadrons of the United States Air National Guard
Communications squadrons of the United States Air Force